Manuel Guinard and Arthur Rinderknech were the defending champions but chose not to defend their title.

Julian Cash and Henry Patten won the title after defeating Arthur Fery and Giles Hussey 6–3, 6–3 in the final.

Seeds

Draw

References

External links
 Main draw

Challenger Banque Nationale de Drummondville - Doubles
2022 Doubles